Mary Jesse Walton is an American actress, best known for her role as Kelly Harper in CBS soap opera Capitol and as Jill Abbott on the CBS soap opera, The Young and the Restless. She also starred in the 2018 movie Christmas with a View.

Early life
Walton was born in Grand Rapids, Michigan, but raised in Toronto, Canada, where she attended Loretto Abbey Catholic Secondary School. She left home at the age of 17 and joined a Toronto theater company. In 1969, she moved to Hollywood and the next year signed with Universal Studios.

Career
In 1970s, Walton guest-starred in a number of television shows, such as Medical Center; Kojak; Marcus Welby, M.D.; Ironside; The Rockford Files; Gunsmoke; Cannon; and Barnaby Jones. She co-starred in film The Strawberry Statement (1970), and portrayed the female lead roles of The Peace Killers (1971) and Monkeys in the Attic (1974). She also appeared in The Hunted Lady (1977) starring Donna Mills. During that time her social life also heated up and she was briefly wed to actor Bruce Davison from 1972–73; the marriage was annulled within the year. However, her life began to spiral out of control when she turned to alcohol and drugs. In 1980, she completed rehab.

In 1984, Walton returned to acting with the role of Kelly Harper on the CBS daytime soap opera, Capitol. The show was cancelled in 1987. Later in that year, Walton joined the cast of another CBS soap opera, The Young and the Restless, in the role as Jill Foster Abbott. The role was originally portrayed by Brenda Dickson, who departed in 1980, and the role was first recast with Deborah Adair. In 1983, Dickson returned to the role, and though she stated that she would never leave, she was replaced by Walton in 1987. Walton won a Daytime Emmy Award in 1997 for Lead Actress in a Drama Series for her portrayal of Jill, and was nominated in 1996, 2000, and 2017. She also won the Daytime Emmy for Outstanding Supporting Actress in 1991, after a nomination in 1990.

Personal life
Walton was married to John James, an author and founder of The Grief Recovery Institute from 1980 until his death in August 2021. In an interview, Walton said, "Before John James, I had always gone for bohemian, rock and roll types. John didn't fit the image; he was straighter." The couple had two children and Walton still resides in Oregon.

Walton briefly dated one of the managers for Joni Mitchell and Crosby, Stills, Nash & Young, and for a time, she associated with them and other musicians, including Laura Nyro and Neil Young. In an interview, Walton recalled a memorable occasion where Nyro taught Walton and Mitchell how to belly dance. Walton says that one of the houses featured on Joni Mitchell's Ladies of the Canyon cover belonged to her.

Walton was good friends with her Y&R co-star Jeanne Cooper, who portrayed her character Jill's arch-rival Katherine Chancellor from 1973 until her death in May 2013.

Filmography

References

External links

Living people
American soap opera actresses
American television actresses
Actresses from Grand Rapids, Michigan
Canadian soap opera actresses
Canadian television actresses
Canadian people of American descent
Daytime Emmy Award for Outstanding Lead Actress in a Drama Series winners
Daytime Emmy Award for Outstanding Supporting Actress in a Drama Series winners
Daytime Emmy Award winners
20th-century American actresses
21st-century American actresses
20th-century Canadian actresses
21st-century Canadian actresses
Year of birth missing (living people)